Mohamed Kholafy (born 11 March 1977) is an Egyptian cyclist. He competed in the men's individual road race at the 2000 Summer Olympics.

References

External links
 

1977 births
Living people
Egyptian male cyclists
Olympic cyclists of Egypt
Cyclists at the 2000 Summer Olympics
Place of birth missing (living people)